The 1956 Boston College Eagles football team represented Boston College as an independent during the 1956 NCAA University Division football season. Led by sixth-year head coach Mike Holovak, the Eagles compiled a record of 5–4. Boston College played home games at Fenway Park in Boston, Massachusetts.

Schedule

References

Boston College
Boston College Eagles football seasons
Boston College Eagles football
1950s in Boston